Todor Enev (born 8 February 1982) is a former professional Bulgarian tennis player. On 16 August 2004, he reached his highest ATP singles ranking of 252 whilst his best doubles ranking was 360 on 13 May 2002.

Year-end rankings

Challenger and Futures Finals

Singles: 16 (9–7)

Doubles: 20 (7–13)

Davis Cup 
Todor Enev debuted for the Bulgaria Davis Cup team in 1999. Since then he has 24 nominations with 33 ties played, his singles W/L record is 17–14 and doubles W/L record is 11–6 (28–20 overall).

Singles (17–14)

Doubles (11–6) 

 RPO = Relegation Play–off
 PPO = Promotion Play–off
 RR = Round Robin

References

External links

 
 
 

Bulgarian male tennis players
1982 births
Living people
Sportspeople from Plovdiv
21st-century Bulgarian people